The Netherlands competed at the 2000 Summer Olympics in Sydney, Australia.

Medalists

Archery

Athletics

Men
Track & road events

Field events

Women
Track & road events

Field events

Badminton

Baseball

In their second appearance in Olympic baseball, The Netherlands repeated their fifth-place finish. They scored victories over Australia and Italy to begin (→ game 1) and end (→ game 7) the preliminary round, but suffered four defeats in between (→ games 2, 3, 5, and 6). In game 4, however, the Dutch team served Cuba its first defeat in the history of Olympic baseball, breaking a 21-game winning streak (→ in its third Olympiad) by the Cubans.

Team roster

 Sharnol Adriana
 Sharnol Leonard
 Johnny Balentina
 Patrick Beljaards
 Ken Brauckmiller
 Rob Cordemans
 Jeffrey Cranston 
 Mike Crouwel
 Radhames Dijkhoff
 Robert Eenhoorn
 Rikkert Faneyte
 Evert-Jan 't Hoen
 Chairon Isenia

 Percy Isenia
 Eelco Jansen
 Ferenc Jongejan
 Dirk van 't Klooster
 Patrick de Lange
 Reily Legito
 Jurriaan Lobbezoo
 Remy Maduro
 Hensley Meulens
 Ralph Milliard
 Erik Remmerswaal
 Orlando Stewart

 Head coach: Pat Murphy

Results

Cycling

Road
Men

Women

Mountain bike

Track
Pursuit

Omnium

Equestrian

Dressage

* Arjen Teeuwissen was qualified to compete in the Grand Prix Freestyle, but due to a restriction on the number of nation quotas (maximum number is 3), he could not continue to the final round.

Show jumping
{| class="wikitable" style="font-size:90%"
|-
!rowspan="3"|Athlete
!rowspan="3"|Horse
!rowspan="3"|Event
!colspan="8"|Qualification
!colspan="4"|Final
!colspan="2" rowspan="2"|Total
|- style="font-size:95%"
!colspan="2"|Round 1
!colspan="3"|Round 2
!colspan="3"|Round 3
!colspan="2"|Round A
!colspan="2"|Round B
|- style="font-size:95%"
!Penalties
!Rank
!Penalties
!Total 
!Rank
!Penalties
!Total 
!Rank
!Penalties
!Rank
!Penalties
!Rank
!Penalties
!Rank
|-align=center
| Jeroen Dubbeldam
| Sjiem
| rowspan=4|Individual
| 0.50
| =1
| 8.00
| 8.50
| =7
| 4.00
| 12.50
| 5 Q
| 0.00
| =1 Q
| 4.00
| =3
| 0.00
| 
|-align=center
| Jos Lansink
| Carthago Z
| 9.00
| =27
| 4.00
| 13.00
| =15
| 8.00
| 21.00
| =21 Q
| 12.00
| =20 Q
| 8.00
| 
| colspan=2 
|-align=center
| Jan Tops
| Roofs
| 6.25
| 20
| 13.25
| 19.50
| 35
| 12.00
| 31.50
| 41*
| colspan=6| did not advance
|-align=center
| Albert Voorn
| Lando
| 12.00
| =35
| 4.00
| 16.00
| =23
| 4.00
| 20.000
| =18 Q
| 4.00
| =5 Q
| 0.00
| =1
| 4.00
| 
|-align=center
| Jeroen DubbeldamJos LansinkJan TopsAlbert Voorn
| See above
| Team
| 16.00
| 6
| 16.00
| 32.00
| =4
| colspan=7 
| 32.00
| 5
|}* Jan Tops was qualified to compete in the Final, but due to a restriction on the number of nation quotas (maximum number is 3), he could not continue.

Judo

Men

Women

Rowing

Men

Women

Sailing

Women

Open

Match racing

Shooting

Men

Swimming

Men

Women

Taekwondo

Triathlon

At the inaugural Olympic triathlon competition, the Netherlands was represented by three men and three women. The nation's best result came from Wieke Hoogzaad at twenty-fifth place in the women's competition, while Dennis Looze was the last finisher in the men's race.

Volleyball

Men
Team roster
 Peter Blangé
 Albert Cristina
 Martijn Dieleman
 Bas van de Goor
 Mike van de Goor
 Guido Görtzen
 Martin van der Horst
 Joost Kooistra
 Reinder Nummerdor
 Richard Schuil
 Head coach: Toon Gerbrands

Preliminary Round (Group A)

|}

|}

Quarterfinals

|}

5th–8th semifinals

|}

5th place match

|}

Water polo

Men
Team roster
 Marco Booij
 Bjørn Boom
 Bobbie Brebde
 Matthijs de Bruijn
 Arie van de Bunt
 Arno Havenga
 Bas de Jong
 Harry van der Meer
 Gerben Silvis
 Kimmo Thomas
 Eelco Uri
 Wim Vermeulen
 Niels Zuidweg
 Head coach: Johan Aantjes

Preliminary Round (Group B)

Classification Round

Women
Team roster
 Gillian van den Berg
 Hellen Boering
 Daniëlle de Bruijn
 Edmée Hiemstra
 Karin Kuipers
 Ingrid Leijendekker
 Patricia Megens
 Mirjam Overdam
 Heleen Peerenboom
 Karla Plugge
 Carla Quint
 Marjan op den Velde
 Ellen Bast
 Head coach': Jan Mensink

Preliminary Round Robin

Semifinals

Bronze-medal match

References

 Wallechinsky, David (2004). The Complete Book of the Summer Olympics (Athens 2004 Edition)''. Toronto, Canada. .
 International Olympic Committee (2001).
 Sydney Organising Committee for the Olympic Games (2001). Official Report of the XXVII Olympiad Volume 1: Preparing for the Games. Retrieved 20 November 2005.
 Sydney Organising Committee for the Olympic Games (2001). Official Report of the XXVII Olympiad Volume 2: Celebrating the Games. Retrieved 20 November 2005.
 Sydney Organising Committee for the Olympic Games (2001). The Results. Retrieved 20 November 2005.
 International Olympic Committee Web Site
 Olympics 2000 by ESPN with event schedules

Nations at the 2000 Summer Olympics
2000
O